Criticism of Hinduism has been applied to both historical and current aspects of Hinduism, notably Sati and the caste system.

Historical background

Early opposition 
Some of the earliest criticism of Brahminical texts, including the Vedas and especially the Dharmashastras, comes from the Sramana (or renunciate) traditions, including Buddhism and Jainism. Sramana scholars viewed Brahminical philosophy as "heretical." In particular Sramanas denied the sruti (divine) nature of the Vedas and opposed sacrificial rituals which were at the heart of Brahminical philosophy at the time.

Sati 

Sati was a historical Hindu practice, in which a widow sacrifices herself by sitting atop her deceased husband's funeral pyre. Vidya Dehejia states that sati was introduced late into Indian society, and became regular only after 500 CE. The practice became prevalent from 7th century onwards and declined to its elimination in 17th century to gain resurgence in Bengal in 18th century. Roshen Dalal postulated that its mention in some of the Puranas indicates that it slowly grew in prevalence from 5th-7th century and later became an accepted custom around 1000 CE among those of higher classes, especially the Rajputs.

According to Dehejia, sati originated within the Kshatriyas (warrior) aristocracy and remained mostly limited to the warrior class among Hindus. Yang adds that the practice was also emulated by those seeking to achieve high status of the royalty and the warriors. The increase of sati may also be related to the centuries of Islamic invasion and its expansion in South Asia. It acquired an additional meaning as a means to preserve the honour of women whose men had been slain, especially with the variant of mass sati called jauhar, practiced especially among the Rajputs as a direct response to the onslaught they experienced.

The Mughal Empire (1526–1857) rulers and the Muslim population were ambivalent about the practice, with many Mughal emperors forbidding the practice, and later European travelers record that sati was not much practiced in the Mughal empire. It was notably associated with elite Hindu Rajput clans in western India, marking one of the points of divergence between Hindu Rajputs and the Muslim Mughals.

With the onset of the British Raj, opposition against sati grew. The principal campaigners against Sati were Christian and Hindu reformers such as William Carey and Ram Mohan Roy. In 1829 Lord Bentinck issued Regulation XVII declaring Sati to be illegal and punishable in criminal courts. On 2 February 1830 this law was extended to Madras and Bombay. The ban was challenged by a petition signed by "several thousand... Hindoo inhabitants of Bihar, Bengal, Orissa etc" and the matter went to the Privy Council in London. Along with British supporters, Ram Mohan Roy presented counter-petitions to parliament in support of ending Sati. The Privy Council rejected the petition in 1832, and the ban on Sati was upheld.

Caste system 

Human Rights Watch describes the caste system as "discriminatory and cruel, inhuman, and degrading treatment" of over 165 million people in India. The justification of the discrimination on the basis of caste, which according to HRW is "a defining feature of Hinduism," has repeatedly been noticed and described by the United Nations and HRW, along with criticism of other caste systems worldwide.

See also
 Saffron terror
 Criticism of Hindutva
 Anti-Brahminism
 Anti-Hindu sentiment
 Persecution of Hindus

References

Sources

External links

 
Hinduism
Hindu law
Hinduism-related controversies